The Burneside Tramway was initially a narrow gauge and later a standard gauge industrial railway serving the James Cropper paper mills around Burneside, Cumbria.

History

The tramway was built in 1879-80 as a  line to connect the paper mills run by James Cropper and Co in Burneside and Cowan Head. Wagons were hauled by horse power.

In 1951 Rachel was replaced by a diesel Ruston 48 No.294266. 
 
The line to Cowan Head closed in 1965, with the section between Burneside Mill and Burneside railway station still operating until it closed in 1974.

Rachel has survived and is preserved at the Lakeside and Haverthwaite Railway. The Ruston was named Flying Flea at Carnforth before moving south to Sir William McAlpine's Fawley Hill Railway where it was named Sir William. The locomotive was not in regular use, and was sold to the YouTuber Lawrie of Lawrie's Mechanical Marvels, moved to the Mid Suffolk Light Railway and renamed Sir William McAlpine.

References

Rail transport in Cumbria
Tram transport in England
3 ft 6 in gauge railways in England
Standard gauge railways in England
Industrial railways in England
Railway lines opened in 1880
Railway lines closed in 1974
1880 establishments in England
Horse-drawn railways